Georg von Schönenberg (1530 – 11 August 1595) was the Prince-Bishop of Worms from 1581 to 1595.  He was appointed bishop on January 16, 1581, and died in office on August 11, 1595.

Numismatics

Georg von Schönenberg is numismatically significant, as during his reign as Prince-Bishop of Worms he minted coins at Neuleiningen.

References

1530 births
1595 deaths
Roman Catholic bishops of Worms
16th-century Roman Catholic bishops